The House of Bourbon-Parma is a cadet branch of the Spanish royal family, whose members once ruled as King of Etruria and as Duke of Parma and Piacenza, Guastalla, and Lucca. The House descended from the French Capetian dynasty in male line. Its name of Bourbon-Parma comes from the main name (Bourbon) and the other (Parma) from the title of Duke of Parma. The title was held by the Spanish Bourbons as the founder was the great-grandson of Ranuccio II Farnese, Duke of Parma.

Duchy of Parma
The Duchy of Parma was created in 1545 from that part of the Duchy of Milan south of the Po River, as a fief for Pope Paul III's illegitimate son, Pier Luigi Farnese, centered on the city of Parma.
In 1556, the second Duke, Ottavio Farnese, was given the city of Piacenza, becoming thus also Duke of Piacenza, and so the state was thereafter properly known as the Duchies of Parma and Piacenza.

Temporary Habsburg rule
The Habsburgs only ruled until the conclusion of the Treaty of Aix-la-Chapelle in 1748, when it was ceded back to the Bourbons in the person of Philip of Spain, Charles's younger brother.  As duke Philip, he became the founder of the House of Bourbon-Parma.

In 1796, the duchy was occupied by French troops under Napoleon Bonaparte.

In 1814, the duchies were restored under Napoleon's Habsburg wife, Marie Louise, who was to rule them for her lifetime. The duchy was renamed the duchy of Parma, Piacenza and Guastalla.

Return to the Bourbons
After Marie Louise's death in 1847, the duchy was restored to the Bourbon-Parma line, which had been ruling the tiny duchy of Lucca. As part of the return the Duchy of Guastalla was transferred to the Duchy of Modena. The Bourbons ruled until 1859, when they were driven out by a revolution following the Sardinian victory in their war against Austria.

The duchies of Parma, Piacenza and Guastalla and the duchy of Lucca joined with the Grand Duchy of Tuscany and the duchy of Modena to form the United Provinces of Central Italy in December 1859, and were annexed to the Kingdom of Sardinia in March 1860.
The House of Bourbon continues to claim the title of duke of Parma to this day. Carlos-Hugo (Carlist pretender to the Spanish throne in the 1970s) held the title from 1977 to his death. His son now claims the title.

The Dukes

House of Bourbon-Parma (1731–1735)

House of Bourbon-Parma (1748–1802)

During the French ownership of the Duchy of Parma, the title of Duke of Parma was used as an honorary form and style. From 1808, the title was used by Jean Jacques Régis de Cambacérès. He kept the style of Duke of Parma until 1814. Only in 1847 was the actual title restored to the Bourbons, after a period of being held by Marie Louise of Austria, who was a Habsburg and the second wife of Napoleon I.

House of Bourbon-Parma (1847–1859)

Nominal Dukes of Parma (since 1859)

See also
 Descendants of Louis XIV of France
 List of Dukes of Parma
 Order of Prohibited Legitimacy
 Pretenders to the throne of Parma

References

External links
 Official website of the House of Bourbon-Parma 
 Website of the Royal and Ducal House of Bourbon-Parma 
 

 
 
Duchy of Parma
House of Farnese
Bourbon-Parma
Bourbon-Parma
1748 establishments in Italy